Christian Caruana (born 21 October 1986) is a Maltese international footballer who plays for Floriana, as a midfielder.

Career
Caruana began his career with Floriana during the 2004–05 season.
He made his international debut for Malta in 2011.

References

1986 births
Living people
Maltese footballers
Malta international footballers
Floriana F.C. players
Association football midfielders